Vladimir Bodnar (born December 26, 1942 in Stara Ushytsia village, Kamianets-Podilskyi Raion, Khmelnytskyi Oblast, Ukrainian SSR) is a politician and community leader from Transnistria. He is co-chairman of the Joint Control Commission which was formed to oversee the negotiated ceasefire following the 1992 War of Transnistria. He is a former member and deputy speaker of parliament (2001–2005) and president of the Union of Ukrainians in Transnistria. While in parliament, he was head of the parliamentary committee on security and defense.

Biography
Vladimir Bodnar is born in Stara Ushytsia, Kamenets-Podolsk region of Ukraine on December 26, 1942. He is a Ukrainian. After graduating from the Financial College in Chernivtsi, he worked in the Moldovan SSR Financial-Budget Administration.

In 1982 he graduated from Odessa National Institute of Economics, specializing in labor economics and then working in agricultural organizations in Grigoriopol district. He is elected deputy to the People's Deputies' Rural Soviet and vice-president of the Grigoriopol District Executive Committee and the Provisional Supreme Soviet of the self-proclaimed Moldovan Dniester Republic.

Vladimir Bodnar is a founding member of the Union of Ukrainians in Transnistria, serving as prime vice president (1991-1998) and president (1998-2004). He was dismissed from the leadership of the Union of Ukrainians in Transnistria at the end of 2004.
He is a staunch opponent of attempts to unify Transnistria and Moldova and has at times advocated the incorporation of Transnistria into Ukraine.

References

1942 births
Living people
People from Stara Ushytsia
Transnistrian politicians
Transnistrian people of Ukrainian descent